Nabar (also Romanized as Nābar) is a village in Babaafzal Rural District, Barzok District, Kashan County, Isfahan Province, Iran. At the 2006 census, its population was 106, in 33 families.

References 

Populated places in Kashan County